Anthony Milner Lane  (1928–2011) was a leading theoretical nuclear physicist who had a career in the Theoretical Physics Division at the Atomic Energy and Research Establishment (AERE) at Harwell.

He was elected Fellow of the Royal Society in 1975.

References

1928 births
2011 deaths
Fellows of the Royal Society
Nuclear physicists